House of Many Ways is a young adult fantasy novel written by Diana Wynne Jones. The story is set in the same world as Howl's Moving Castle and Castle in the Air.

Summary
Charmain Baker has led a respectable, and relaxing sheltered life. She has spent her days with her nose in a book, never learning how to do even the smallest household chores. When she suddenly ends up looking after the tiny cottage of her ill Great-Uncle William she seems happy for the adventure, but the easy task of house-sitting is complicated by the fact that Great-Uncle William is also the Royal Wizard Norland and his magical house bends space and time.

Though she is supposed to clean up the mess William has left the house in, Charmain knows next to nothing about magic, and yet she seems to work it in the most unexpected way. The house's single door can lead to almost any place – from other rooms like the kitchen, to faraway places like the Royal Palace, and even other time periods. In her first days in the magical house she ends up looking after a magical stray dog named Waif, encounters a horrible lubbock, has to share a roof with a confused young apprentice wizard named Peter, tries to work some spells from William's library, and deals with a clan of small blue creatures called Kobolds.

When Charmain is caught up in an intense royal search to remedy the kingdom's financial troubles, she encounters Sophie Pendragon, her son Morgan, a beautiful child named Twinkle, and their fire demon Calcifer. One of the messes Twinkle gets Charmain into results in Twinkle climbing onto the roof of the Royal Mansion. She is soon involved in curing the kingdom of its ills and rediscovering the long-lost mystical Elfgift.

Main characters
 Charmain Baker
 She is a thin-faced, ginger-haired girl in her mid-teens who is also known as "Miss Charming", most likely due to the similarity to her name. She grew up in a "respectable" family environment to be "respectable"; as a result, she does not know how to do much besides reading (e.g. she does not know how to use hot water to make tea), and has little interest in anything but reading books. Because she often is so focused on only one aspect of a situation, she can fail to see the larger picture. She has the abilities of a witch, inherited from her family on her father's side, who revealed to her that he uses magic in his cooking, but she was raised by her mother to think that magic was vulgar – when angry, she can literally force anything to happen by yelling what she wants out loud, a technique which she herself admits to be rather crude. Charmain's ambition is to become a librarian and she becomes entangled in the mystery of the missing royal gold when she comes to aid the king in sorting out documents at the royal library. She is ultimately apprenticed to her uncle, along with Peter, to nurture her magical gifts. She and Peter begin with a difficult relationship that slowly gets better; she also befriends Howl (as "Twinkle"), Calcifer and Sophie.

 Peter Regis
 He is a boy of about Charmain's age who arrives at Wizard Norland's house while she is looking after it, claiming that he is to be the Wizard's apprentice. Charmain confirms this by reading a letter that Peter wrote on Great-Uncle William's desk, which she had missed before his arrival, due to the fact that there were many letters containing the words "apprentice" and "hopeful", so she had assumed his letter was another one begging for an apprenticeship. For some reason he cannot ever get a spell right - though he does it perfectly, something bad always happens - and causes trouble left and right, which he cannot tell apart, and has to tie coloured strings to his thumbs to tell left from right. However, Peter is more experienced in practical household tasks than Charmain, though he has no idea how to cook. The two initially have trouble getting along because of Peter's confidence and Charmain's haughtiness, but they gradually start getting along better. His mother is Matilda, the Witch of Montalbino, and his father died in an avalanche.

 William Norland
 The royal sorcerer of High Norland is sent away to be cared for by the elves when he falls sick (this is discovered to be caused by Lubbock eggs). It is arranged that Charmain, a distant relation, will take care of his house while he is away. Charmain knows him as Great-Uncle William and though he is not present in the house, he leaves magical instructions for Charmain if she has trouble managing things in the house. His voice is described as kindly and he is well respected by many, including the Wizard Howl.

 Sophie Pendragon
 She was known as Sophie Hatter prior to her marriage. A lovely, powerful witch with red-gold hair from Ingary, Sophie is able to talk life into objects. She has a young son named Morgan and is married to the Wizard Howl. She takes on the task of trying to solve a mystery for the King of High Norland, but is dismayed when her husband decides to follow her to High Norland, bringing Calcifer and Morgan along in order to help her. She is reluctantly amused by her husband's antics as "Twinkle", and thoroughly annoyed at the extent of his enjoyment of his second childhood.

 Howl Pendragon
 Known also as the High Wizards Pendragon or Jenkins and one of the Royal High Wizards of Ingary, Howl is a flamboyant, handsome and incredibly clever sorcerer of immense magical ability, who is also Sophie's husband. He transforms himself into the ridiculously adorable alisping child called Twinkle, and claims that Sophie is his "aunt" in order to meddle with the mystery that only Sophie was supposed to be involved as the King cannot "poach" someone else's royal high wizard into helping. Howl figures out where the king's lost gold was hidden and where the Elfgift is, with the aid of Sophie (who is reluctantly forced to keep his secret) and Charmain, in whom he recognises latent magical potential.

 Calcifer
 He is a powerful multicolored fire demon, who was originally a falling star, that lives with Sophie and Howl and moves their castle. Because of his tremendous powers, he is able to perceive Charmain's inherent magical nature, much like he did with Sophie Hatter. He proves to be essential at thwarting the Lubbock's plans. Sophie also believes that he collaborated with Howl in giving no effort to stop Morgan crying, and therefore using him as an excuse to join Sophie on her task.

 Morgan Pendragon
 Howl and Sophie's firstborn child is almost two, extremely noisy, and is rather mischievous with a slight problem pronouncing "T"s. When Sophie leaves for High Norland, she leaves Morgan in the care of Howl and Calcifer and is outraged by Howl's decision to follow her. Howl uses Morgan as an excuse to be "Twinkle", as they could not get him to stop crying for Sophie (though he later admits he did not even try.) When Howl transforms back, Morgan is glad to see his father again, but after a while whines for the lisping toddler, "Dinkle". He has inherited his parents' magic, as when he demanded toys in the palace and was refused them, he threw a tantrum and made toys appear from nowhere.

 Waif
 She is a rare enchanted dog who befriends Charmain. Charmain realises that Waif most likely possessed magical powers throughout the book, and this is confirmed when the Witch of Montalbino tells Charmain that Waif has rare magical qualities. One such quality is that when Charmain first arrived, Waif was taken to be a male dog, but then she changed her gender to match Charmain's, the reason being that Waif was so fond of her. Great-Uncle William originally brought Waif to his house as a stray dog shortly before Charmain came to look after his house. Waif is more than meets the eye, and though small in size, she consumes large quantities of food, though this may be because she becomes pregnant, the father being the royal cook's dog (an event which Charmain only realises at the end of the book).

 King Adolphus X
 The elderly and impoverished monarch of High Norland lives in the Royal Mansion. He has a daughter, Princess Hilda, and is a good friend of Great-Uncle William. He and Princess Hilda have been struggling to organize the books in the Royal Library in order to find the king's lost gold, but have had little progress. He is very fond of cakes and crumpets, and is good-humoured. He shows kind hospitality and patience to Charmain, who assumes that she is a commoner imposing on a royal, though impoverished, family.

 Princess Hilda
 She is the elderly and unmarried Princess of High Norland and King Adolphus's daughter. She was one of the princesses kidnapped by the djinn Hasruel in Castle in the Air and responsible for bringing Abdullah's friend Jamal, accompanied by his dog, to be the royal family's cook. Since she is acquainted with Sophie, Hilda invites Sophie to High Norland to solve the mystery of the missing royal treasury.

 Lubbock
 He is a horribly evil man-like creature with purple skin, wings, and the face of an insect.  Lubbock can "lay" eggs inside creatures without them noticing. For males, the egg that hatches first consumes the other lubbock eggs and the male dies. For a female, the egg that hatches first consumes the other lubbock eggs and she gives birth as normal and then usually dies.  The result of the birth from a human female is a lubbockin that looks mostly human except for purple eyes or purple tinted skin. The lubbock seen in the book wishes to rule High Norland by placing the lubbockin Ludovic on the throne and using him as a puppet king.

External links
 .

British fantasy novels
Novels by Diana Wynne Jones
2008 British novels
British young adult novels
Howl's Moving Castle
2008 fantasy novels
Greenwillow Books books